Chocklet (sometimes Chocolate) is a 2001 Indian Tamil-language action romance film directed by A. Venkatesh the story penned by R. Madhesh and produced by R. Madhesh. Starring Prashanth and debutant Jaya Re, the film also has Livingston, Suhasini, Mumtaj (dual role) and Nagendra Prasad in supporting roles, while the score and soundtrack are composed by Deva. The film opened on 7 September 2001 to a positive response and was successful at the box office.

Plot 
Aravind meets Anjali and falls in love at first sight without knowing her background. When they meet, Anjali tells Aravind she would like to go for a trial-romance for a week, which might lead to a long-term romance, for which he agrees. Anjali is the daughter of assistant  Commissioner Jayachandran and Saradha. Aravind maintains a cordial acquaintance with both of them, not knowing Anjali is their daughter. Anjali acknowledges them as her parents. Jayachandran convinces Anjali to dispense with this trial romance and make a deeper commitment as he finds Aravind a gentleman. Aravind convinces Saradha to support him as her suitor, so Saradha makes Aravind marry Anjali.

Cast

Production
The film began production in January 2001 and scenes were shot at Mayajaal for three days later that month. At an official launch event held soon afterwards, producer R. Madhesh donated seventy five kilogrammes of chocolate to poor children, equivalent to the weight of the film's actor Prashanth. Reemma Sen and Richa Pallod were considered to play the heroines, though their high remuneration meant that the makers signed on Avantika, a former Miss Goa pageant winner. For the film, Avantika was given the stagename of Jaya Re.

A fight scene was shot at Koyambedu Market Road near Chennai with 16 cameras, while scenes were shot in Japan and a song was shot on a cruise ship between Cambodia and Vietnam.

Release
The film opened to positive reviews in September 2001, after having an initial premiere at Bay Area, San Francisco. A critic from Sify.com noted "The film tantalises in the beginning only to  its fizz halfway through", adding "our heart goes straight out to Prashanth who despite the odds, comes up with a decent performance." Malathi Rangarajan of The Hindu reviewed the film and added that "this youthful bonanza gets stretched, testing one's patience towards the end, none but the screenplay is to blame." Rediff.com meanwhile gave the film a negative review noting "Matters are built towards a loud, dramatic, implausible climax. This one's a mess and what you keep wondering is why an accomplished actress like Suhasini Mani Rathnam had to make this the vehicle for one of her rare celluloid appearances." A critic from Cinesouth.com noted "The film is bubbling with youthful feelings. It contains some admirable scenes also. Thus, movie manages to make its mark with a lot difficulties."

The film was later dubbed and released in Telugu in March 2002 with the same name and won positive reviews from critics. After the success of the film led Prashanth and A. Venkatesh re-unite and announced a project called Petrol in 2005 but Prashanth's marital problems eventually led to delays in the director's schedule and the film remains uncompleted.

Music
The music was composed by Deva and lyrics by Vaali. The song Malai Malai was the anthem for many youth around the time of the movie's release. Producer R. Madhesh opted against having a traditional audio cassette release function and chose to distribute the cassettes to music shops enclosed with Cadbury chocolate.

References 

2001 films
2000s Tamil-language films
Indian romantic musical films
Twins in Indian films
Films directed by A. Venkatesh (director)